Joseph Bryan (1773–1812) was a United States Representative from Georgia.

Joseph Bryan may also refer to:
 Joseph Hunter Bryan (1782–1839), United States Representative from North Carolina
 Joseph M. Bryan (1896–1995), American businessman and philanthropist
 Joe Bryan (born 1993), English professional footballer